Christopher John Albright (born January 14, 1979) is an American former soccer player and current general manager for FC Cincinnati in Major League Soccer.

Youth and college
Albright attended William Penn Charter School. A forward early in his career, Albright played college soccer at the University of Virginia for two years; he was named an All-American in 1999.

Club career
Considered one of the best attacking prospects in the country, he leveraged foreign interest into getting assigned to D.C. United, despite the club being low on MLS's pecking order for Project-40 players. The league forced a trade with the Miami Fusion for future considerations, which turned out to be Roy Lassiter, but not until both Albright and Lassiter helped DC to the 1999 MLS Cup.

But Albright's club career did not live up to the lofty expectations. He struggled to find the back of the net, scoring just four goals total in his first three years in the league. D.C. dealt him to Los Angeles Galaxy for a draft pick prior to the 2002 season.

Albright drifted further onto the midfield, and then found himself in the back as the Galaxy's starting right defender for the 2003 and 2004 seasons. With Los Angeles Albright became one of the league's top right-backs, and was honored as an MLS Best XI selection in 2005. During his time with the Galaxy he helped the club capture two MLS Cup and one U.S. Open Cup title.  He appeared in 116 league matches, scoring 7 goals.

On January 18, 2008, Albright was traded to New England Revolution in return for allocation money. During the 2008 season Albright was a fixture for New England at right-back appearing in 26 league matches; however during the 2009 season he suffered a season-ending injury that limited him to only one appearance.

Albright was traded to New York Red Bulls on January 14, 2010, in exchange for picks #31 and #48 in the 2010 MLS SuperDraft. After beginning the 2010 season on injured reserve Albright regained his form and became the club's starting right-back and helped New York capture the regular season Eastern Conference title.

Following the 2011 season, the Red Bulls declined the 2012 option on Albright's contract, making him eligible for the 2011 MLS Re-Entry Draft. Albright was not selected in the draft and became a free agent.

On February 13, 2012, Albright signed to play for his hometown Philadelphia Union. He retired at the conclusion of the 2013 season

International career
Albright's first attempt at playing defense came with United States national team coach Bruce Arena, who gave him his first cap on September 8, 1999, against Jamaica. Albright scored his lone U.S. goal that day and has accumulated 21 caps as of 2007.

Albright was listed as an alternate for Bruce Arena's 23-man squad for the 2006 FIFA World Cup in Germany and made the final squad two days after the initial roster announcement due to the injury of Frankie Hejduk. Albright did not appear in a match in the tournament.

International goals

Post playing career
In January 2014, Albright was announced as joining the Philadelphia Union's technical staff as assistant technical director. His responsibilities would focus on assisting in player management and movement along with player and coaching decisions.

In October 2021, FC Cincinnati announced Albright had been hired as the new General Manager of the club.

Career statistics

Club

International

Honors

D.C. United
Major League Soccer MLS Cup (1): 1999
Major League Soccer MLS Supporters Shield (1): 1999

New England Revolution
North American SuperLiga (1): 2008

Los Angeles Galaxy
Major League Soccer MLS Cup (2): 2002, 2005
Major League Soccer MLS Supporters Shield (1): 2002
Lamar Hunt U.S. Open Cup U.S. Open Cup (1): 2005

Individual
MLS Best XI: 2005

Technical Director
Philadelphia Union
 Supporters Shield: 2020

References

External links

1979 births
Living people
American soccer players
Soccer players from Philadelphia
Virginia Cavaliers men's soccer players
D.C. United players
MLS Pro-40 players
LA Galaxy players
New England Revolution players
New York Red Bulls players
Philadelphia Union players
Major League Soccer players
A-League (1995–2004) players
Major League Soccer All-Stars
Olympic soccer players of the United States
Footballers at the 2000 Summer Olympics
United States men's international soccer players
2006 FIFA World Cup players
United States men's under-20 international soccer players
United States men's under-23 international soccer players
Philadelphia Union non-playing staff
William Penn Charter School alumni
Association football defenders
All-American men's college soccer players